An armistice is an agreement between warring factions to stop fighting.

Armistice may also refer to:

Armistice (album), a 2009 album by Mutemath
Armistice (band), a Canadian indie pop band
 Armistice (film), a 2013 film by Luke Massey starring Joseph Morgan
"Armistice", a song by Phoenix from the 2009 album Wolfgang Amadeus Phoenix
"Armistice", a song by Pure Reason Revolution from the 2010 album Hammer and Anvil
"Armistice", a 2005 episode of the TV series The Colbert Report

See also
Armistice of 11 November 1918, a famous example
Armistice Day